Rasmus Ole Lyberth (born 21 August 1951) is a Greenlandic musician and actor. Since 1970, he has been one of the most popular artists in the Greenlandic music scene. His music is well known beyond the borders of Greenland.

Biography
Rasmus Lyberth was born in Maniitsoq, but grew up in Nuuk, where as a 12-year-old he began performing and playing the guitar. He is the son of a teacher and writer Erik Lyberth and Emma Lyberth. In 1969 he began performing in Copenhagen. In 1974 he recorded his first album, Erningaa.

Erningaa was successful and was followed by his second album, Piumassuseq nukiuvoq, at which point he went on hiatus. He also appeared on the stage of the Greenlandic Tuukaq Teatret, and gave many concerts not only in Denmark and Greenland, but also in many countries in Europe and North America. He has collaborated with other musicians, including Christian Alvad and Lars Lilholt Band.

In 1979 he participated in the Dansk Melodi Grand Prix, performing second on the night with 'Faders bøn' ('Father's Prayer') in Greenlandic, and placing 11th out of 17 entries.)

Discography
 1974: Erningaa
 1978: Piumassuseq nukiuvoq (dan. Viljen er styrke)
 1989: Ajorpianng
 1989: Nanivaat
 1992: Kisimiinngilatit (Kærlighed gør mig smuk)
 1994: Nakuussutigaara
 1998: Qaamaneq isinnit isigaara (Jeg ser lysglimt i dine øjne)
 2001: Inuuneq oqaluttuartaraanngat (Når livet fortæller)
 2006: Asanaqigavit (Kærligst)

Filmography
 1984: Tukuma
 1998: Heart of Light, (Greenlandic Qaamarngup uummataa, dan. Lysets hjerte)
 2003, 2008: Nissernes Ø (TV-Serie)

References

External links

 Official website
 Rasmus Lyberth at the MySpace
 

1951 births
Living people
Greenlandic male actors
Greenlandic male singers
People from Maniitsoq
People from Nuuk